The City of Augusta, Georgia has an expansive transport network. It consists of two airports, various road bridges, national and local bus service, a highway and street network, freight train service, and boat tours and marinas.

Airports

Augusta Regional Airport

Augusta is served by Augusta Regional Airport, formerly known as "Bush Field" (and still referred to as such on highway signs). It is a relatively small airport, especially when compared to more major airports, such as Atlanta's Hartsfield–Jackson Atlanta International Airport. It has one concrete and one asphalt runway. It opened in 1941 as a training facility for the United States Army Air Corps (USAAC; the predecessor of the United States Air Force). It became the commercial airport for the city in 1950. In 2000, the facility was renamed "Augusta Regional Airport at Bush Field".

Daniel Field

Daniel Field is a public use airport. This airport is owned by the City of Augusta. It has two asphalt runways. It was dedicated in late 1927. During World War II, it also served as a training facility of the USAAC, and was known as "Daniel Army Airfield". At the end of 1945, it was returned to civilian use.

Named bridges

Bus service

National bus service
Southeastern Stages serves Augusta, via a bus station on Broad Street. There is also an intercity bus station on Fort Gordon. Greyhound Lines also uses this bus station. The public can access the Army base for certain events and services, such as utilizing this station. They have to provide proper identification.

Public transit
The city has an extensive system of bus service. Augusta Transit operates nine routes throughout the area. These routes are:
Walton Way
West Parkway
East Augusta
Turpin Hill
Washington Road
Gordon Highway
Augusta Mall
Barton Chapel
Lumpkin Road

Highways and streets
Augusta has an extensive highway and street network. It consists of two Interstate Highways, four U.S. Highways, ten state highways, and many streets, both major and minor.

Numbered highways

Major local streets

Numbered streets

Rail service
The January 2008 draft of the Freight Profile for the Augusta Regional Transportation Study indicates that rail cargo accounts for 7% of all  freight in the region by weight (2006 TRANSEARCH). Some of the leading commodities shipped out of Augusta are clay, concrete, glass, and stone  products. The leading commodity terminating in the area is lumber and wood products.

At-grade railroad crossings are located on many roads throughout the city. The crossings have been a part of city life for many years. Solutions have been sought to reduce the inevitable conflicts between railroad, motor vehicle, and pedestrian traffic. The availability of rail service is a major attraction for new industry and maintaining existing industry.

Passenger service
Passenger rail service is currently not available in Augusta. Its last long-distance passenger train was the Southern Railway's Aiken-Augusta Special, which had its last run in 1966. Other companies serving the city were the Atlantic Coast Line Railroad and the Central of Georgia Railway. In 1999, the Georgia Transportation Board approved a long-range plan to provide inter-city passenger rail service between Atlanta and other major cities across the state.

Freight service
There are two freight providers: Norfolk Southern Railway (NS) and CSX.

Norfolk Southern Railway
The NS mainline track, known as the R-Line, enters the city from the north, crossing the Savannah River and traveling through downtown on the right-of-way of 6th Street, and is known as the Augusta District. The mainline continues to the southeast toward Savannah. Its second yard, the Nixon Yard, is south of Augusta Regional Airport near the International Paper plant.

CSX Transportation
The CSX mainline travels through the city in what is essentially an east–west direction. This line, known partially as the Augusta and McCormick subdivisions, connects Augusta to Spartanburg, South Carolina and Savannah. There is a second CSX line, partially known as the Georgia Subdivision, and was formerly owned by Georgia Railroad and Banking Company, is a connection to  Atlanta. CSX has two railroad yards in the city. The main railroad yard is located off of Laney Walker Boulevard southeast of downtown. It consists of an inbound receiving yard and an outbound classification yard.

Water services

Augusta Canal tours
On the Augusta Canal, there are boat tours. These tours are provided using a Petersburg boat, similar to those used on the Savannah River in the 19th century. They show the textile mills, the Confederate Powderworks, and two of Georgia's only remaining 18th century houses.

Marinas
Augusta has two marinas, the Augusta Riverfront Marina and the Riverwalk Marina, also known as the 5th Street Marina. The Riverfront Marina has the following amenities: access to the riverfront, boat slip rentals, boat ramp, and picnic shelter. The Riverwalk Marina has the following amenities: a gift shop, public boat slip, boat slip rentals, playground, picnic area, and fuel service. Riverfront Marina is located on Riverfront Drive, in the East Augusta portion of the city, east of Olde Town. Riverwalk Marina is off of 5th Street, just before it crosses over the Savannah River.

See also

References

External links
AGS - Augusta Rgnl at Bush Field (Augusta) on Georgia Department of Transportation
DNL - Daniel Field (Augusta) on Georgia Department of Transportation

 
 
Transportation in Richmond County, Georgia
Augusta, Georgia